Mackenzie Harvey (born 18 September 2000) is an Australian cricketer. In January 2018, he was drafted in by the Melbourne Renegades as a replacement player for Aaron Finch for 2017-18 Big Bash League season, but did not play.

He made his List A debut for Victoria in the 2018–19 JLT One-Day Cup on 26 September 2018. He made his Twenty20 debut for Melbourne Renegades in the 2018–19 Big Bash League season on 29 December 2018. He is a nephew of former Australian cricketer Ian Harvey.

In December 2019, he was named in Australia's squad for the 2020 Under-19 Cricket World Cup. Initially, Australia did not name a captain of their squad, however Harvey was officially named as the team captain just ahead of their opening match.

References

External links
 

2000 births
Living people
Australian cricketers
Melbourne Renegades cricketers
Victoria cricketers
Place of birth missing (living people)
Cricketers from Melbourne
People from St Kilda, Victoria